Cinctorres is a town in the province of Castellón, Valencian Community, Spain, pertaining to the region of the Ports of Morella. , it has 498 inhabitants.

Geography 
The municipality is located in a small plateau between  Monte Bovalar and the valley of Caldes river.
Thanks to its position, the city offers spectacular  landscaping views. It is not uncommon to see the flight of vultures, which nest in the  environs of the nearby rocks.

Bordering towns 
Todolella, La Mata de Morella, Portell de Morella, Castellfort, Morella and Forcall, all in the province of Castellón.

Main sights
Hermitages of St. Mark (16th century) and St. Peter Martyr (17th century)
Parish church of St. Peter the Apostle (18th century), in Baroque style
Torre dels Moros ("Moorish Tower")
Late-Gothic Town Hall (16th century)
Palace of St. John (17th century)
Old Hospital (16th century), housing a permanent collection of fossils and historical daily life tools

Economy 
The main economic activity, like in other neighbouring localities, is the cattle ranch, in particular pig cattle.  In the last few years, due to the growing importance acquired by the interior tourism, there has been an increase of rural  lodgings, as a complement to the agrarian activity. Construction and service companies are also growing in importance.

Ports (comarca)